It Takes a Whole Lot of Human Feeling is an album by American jazz vocalist Carmen McRae recorded in 1973 and released on the Groove Merchant label. The album's title track is a song from the 1971 musical Don't Bother Me, I Can't Cope.

Reception 

Allmusic's Scott Yanow said: "Carmen McRae's charming version of Blossom Dearie's "Hey John" is enough of a reason to search for this album by itself ... Not all of the selections are of that quality, but overall, this is definitely a worthwhile acquisition for fans of the singer".

Track listing
 "It Takes a Whole Lot of Human Feeling" (Micki Grant) – 3:48
 "I Fall in Love Too Easily" (Jule Styne, Sammy Cahn) – 3:47
 "Hey John" (Blossom Dearie, Jim Council) – 3:23
 "Where Are the Words" (Frank Severino) – 3:17
 "Nice Work If You Can Get It" (George Gershwin, Ira Gershwin) – 2:50
 "Straighten Up and Fly Right" (Nat King Cole, Irving Mills) – 2:47
 "Inside a Silent Tear" (Dearie, Peter King) – 5:49
 "Imagination" (Jimmy Van Heusen. Johnny Burke) – 4:22	
 "The Right to Love" (Lalo Schifrin, Gene Lees) – 4:14
 "All the Things You Are" (Jerome Kern, Oscar Hammerstein II) – 3:59

Personnel
Carmen McRae − vocals
Joe Pass − guitar
Dick Shreve − piano
Ray Brown - bass
Larry Bunker − vibraphone, percussion
Frank Severino − drums

References

Groove Merchant albums
Carmen McRae albums
1973 albums
Albums produced by Dave Pell